Winx Club 3D: Magical Adventure is a 2010 Italian computer-animated film based on Winx Club. The film is a sequel to Winx Club: The Secret of the Lost Kingdom. Its working title, announced in 2009, was Winx Club 3D: The Magic Is Back.

The film was animated by Rainbow S.p.A. In February 2011, Nickelodeon's parent company Viacom became a co-owner of Rainbow, and it was announced that Viacom would re-release Magical Adventure through its subsidiary Paramount Pictures.

On February 19, 2013, Nickelodeon held a special screening of the movie at the TCL Chinese Theatre in Hollywood. Nickelodeon star Daniella Monet (who voiced Bloom's rival, Mitzi, on the show) and Winx Club creator Iginio Straffi both attended the premiere. On May 20, Nickelodeon's American channel aired the movie, and Paramount released it on DVD on August 13.

Plot
The film opens with a welcome party between Alfea and Cloud Tower. During the annual prank by the witches in which the food turns anyone who eats it into toads, the Trix crash it and take the Compass of Revealed Secrets for the Ancestral Witches. Despite the Winx's efforts, Icy, Stormy and Darcy escape with the compass. Meanwhile, on Domino, Bloom struggles to adjust to her new life of royalty. Sky proposes to Bloom, much to the delight of her and her royal family. The Trix report to the Ancestral Witches on the successful theft and learn of the Tree of Life holding the balance between good and evil magical energy. In order to earn the Ancestral Witches' Powers, the Trix searches for the Tree of Life.

Back on Eraklyon, Sky informs his father of his engagement to Bloom. A horrified King Erendor reveals a dark secret about Erendor and Domino's destruction, forcing Sky to call off the engagement and devastating Bloom. Enraged and overprotective of his only living daughter, King Oritel announces Bloom's debut to search for her next prince, according to Domino tradition where the King chooses his daughters' partners. The debut is announced all over Magix, prompting the rest of the Winx to visit Bloom and assist her in reject her would-be suitors. Sky sneaks in and meets Bloom, saying that he will fix everything. He is soon discovered by an angry King Oritel. He gives Bloom a letter before being forced to leave. Bloom protests what is written on the letter but is overruled by her father. An angry Bloom transports to Gardenia with the Winx. At the same time, the Trix arrive at Pixie Village and take over the Tree of Life. This eliminates all good powers of the fairies, along with the Winx's Believix. Powerless in Gardenia, the Winx turn to Bloom's adoptive parents Mike and Vanessa for shelter and meet up with the Specialists. Meanwhile, the Ancestral Witches learn that there is one tiny source of positive energy left in the universe. They remember giving King Erendor an hourglass with the tree's pollen, which protected Eraklyon when the Witches destroyed Domino. In Gardenia, the Winx and the Specialists travel to Avram, which is the city with the last known sighting of the pollen. The Trix find Erendor and force him to give them the whereabouts of the pollen.

Along the way, their ship is attacked by the ghosts of Avram citizens. Oritel discovers Sky's letter, learning of why he called off the wedding. The team learns that Erendor, living with immense guilt for protecting his kingdom while his friend's own was destroyed, broke the hourglass, releasing the pollen and forming a seedling. Trying to get to the middle of Avram, Bloom and Sky get separated from the others. Bloom and Sky end up finding the seedling and Icy, while the rest of the Winx battle Stormy and Darcy. Struggling without their full powers, the Winx and Specialists battle the Witches and their Ancestral counterparts. The ensuing has Icy destroying the seedling, causing all the good magic to be released and restoring the Winx's Believix. The Ancient Witches then merge with their Trix counterparts and attack the Winx. King Oritel and King Erendor arrive to aid the Winx in their battle against the witches and manage to reconcile. Icy manages to kill King Erendor when he sacrifices himself to protect Bloom. The Winx defeat the Trix and destroy the Ancestral Witches with a Believix Convergence. King Oritel reveals that he had collected some of the pollen from the seedling and sprinkles it on Erendor, bringing him back to life. King Oritel apologizes to Sky and gives Bloom and Sky his blessing on their engagement. Bloom and Sky reconcile as the city begins to revive around them. They imprison the Trix once again and fly back to Eraklyon's main city together.

Voice cast

Soundtrack

Winx Club 3D: Magical Adventure (Original Motion Picture Soundtrack) was released on October 1, 2010.

Track listing

References

External links

2010s Italian-language films
Italian animated films
Italian animated fantasy films
Italian fantasy adventure films
Winged unicorns
Winx Club films
Nickelodeon animated films
Paramount Pictures films
Paramount Pictures animated films
Animated films based on animated series
2010 3D films
2010 films
2010 computer-animated films
3D animated films
Rainbow S.r.l. films
Films directed by Iginio Straffi
Films produced by Iginio Straffi
Films with screenplays by Iginio Straffi
2010s American films